The 14th Legislative Assembly of British Columbia sat from 1917 to 1920. The members were elected in the British Columbia general election held in September 1916. The British Columbia Liberal Party, led by Harlan Carey Brewster, formed the government. Following Brewster's death in March 1918, John Oliver became Premier.

John Walter Weart served as speaker until the start of the 1918 session, when John Keen succeeded him as speaker.

Members of the 14th General Assembly 
The following members were elected to the assembly in 1916.:

Notes:

Party standings

By-elections 
By-elections were held for the following members appointed to the provincial cabinet, as was required at the time:
 James Horace King, Minister of Public Works, acclaimed January 3, 1917
 John Oliver, Minister of Agriculture and Railways, acclaimed January 3, 1917
 John Duncan MacLean, Provincial Secretary and Minister of Education, acclaimed January 3, 1917
 William Sloan, Minister of Mines, acclaimed January 3, 1917
 Malcolm Archibald Macdonald, Attorney General, elected January 3, 1917
 Ralph Smith, Minister of Finance, elected January 3, 1917
 Harlan Carey Brewster, Premier, acclaimed January 3, 1917
 Thomas Dufferin Pattullo, Minister of Lands, elected January 13, 1917
 John Wallace deBeque Farris, Attorney General and Minister of Labour, acclaimed June 23, 1917
 John Hart, Minister of Finance, elected June 30, 1917
 Edward Dodsley Barrow, Minister of Agriculture, elected May 25, 1918

By-elections were held to replace members for various other reasons:

Notes:

Other changes 
John William McIntosh resigns from the Liberals in April 1917 to become an Independent Liberal. 
At some point in the life of the legislature McIntosh, Richard John Burde, Kenneth Forrest Duncan and Francis William Henry Giolma form the Soldier Party.
Aitlin (dec. Frank Harry Mobley February 3, 1920)

References 

Political history of British Columbia
Terms of British Columbia Parliaments
1917 establishments in British Columbia
1920 disestablishments in British Columbia
20th century in British Columbia